Hero is a Trinidad and Tobago film produced and directed by Frances-Anne Solomon. It won an award in the 2019 Africa Movie Academy Award for Best Diaspora Narrative Feature Film category.

Synopsis 
In 1941 Ulric Cross, a young man from Trinidad, leaves his island home to seek his fortune. He emerges from World War II as the RAF's most decorated West Indian. His life took a dramatically different course when he followed the call of history, and joined the independence movements sweeping Africa in the 50s and 60s.

Cast 
Kofi Adjorlolo as Asantehene
Jimmy Akingbola as Kwame Nkrumah
Giles Alderson as Professor J. Hawker
Tessa Alexander as Ulric's Mother
Adjetey Anang as Patrice Lumumba
Sam Asante as Journalist
Jonathan Blaize as Young ulric
Ayinde Blake as RAF Pilot

References

External links 
 
 HERO Inspired By The Extraordinary Life & Times Of Mr. Ulric Cross at Library and Archives Canada

2018 films
Canadian drama films
English-language Trinidad and Tobago films
English-language Canadian films
Black Canadian films
2010s English-language films
Trinidad and Tobago drama films
2010s Canadian films